Henry Argue Russell (December 15, 1904 – November 9, 1986) was an American track and field athlete, winner of the gold medal in the 4 × 100 m relay at the 1928 Summer Olympics.

Russell was elected to the Sphinx Head Society during his senior year.

At the Amsterdam Olympics, Russell reached the semifinals in 100 m and ran the anchoring leg in the American 4 × 100 m relay team, which equalled the world record of 41.0 s, in the final.

Henry Russell died at 81 in West Chester, Pennsylvania.

References
 

1904 births
1986 deaths
American male sprinters
Olympic gold medalists for the United States in track and field
Athletes (track and field) at the 1928 Summer Olympics
Cornell University alumni
Medalists at the 1928 Summer Olympics